Sargent's Pond is a man-made  pond on Sargent Road in Brookline, Massachusetts.  The pond was created by Charles Sprague Sargent (best known as the first director of the Arnold Arboretum) in the late 1870s as a centerpiece of his family's extensive Holm Lea estate.  Sargent's estate has since been subdivided, but the roads giving access to it run along the estate's original alignments.  Sargent landscaped the estate using similar principles to those he applied at the Arboretum, with vistas and a variety of trees and shrubs.  The pond was created by damming a brook.  It still has naturalistic plantings around it, although some Sargent's rhododendrons (a significant draw on occasions when he opened the estate to the public) have died.

The pond (along with its immediately surrounding grounds) was listed on the National Register of Historic Places in 1985.

See also
National Register of Historic Places listings in Brookline, Massachusetts

References

National Register of Historic Places in Brookline, Massachusetts
Lakes of Norfolk County, Massachusetts
Brookline, Massachusetts